Abu Zayd Abd al-Rahman ibn Yakhlaftan ibn Ahmad al-Fazazi (died in Fez in 627/1230) was an Arab poet and mystic. He is especially well known for his Al-Wasail al-Mutaqabbala, a long poem in praise of the Islamic prophet Mohammed. It is commonly known as Qasid al-Ishriniyyat fi Madh Saiyidna Muhammad or simply the Ishriniyyat (the twenties) because it consists of sets of twenty rhyming verses for each letter of the alphabet. It was composed in Cordoba in the year 604/1207-8. Al-Fazazi is also the author of Epistle to the Sepulchre of the Prophet. The name Al-Fazazi refers to Fazaz the former name of the Middle Atlas region in north-central Morocco.
It was said that he saw Muhammad in his dream, who appreciated his poem of Ishriniyya and praised him for writing it. He had a very deep love for Muhammad and wanted to travel to his grave in Madina-Almunauwara, but he died before reaching it. 

He was a friend of the panegyrist Abu Ishaq Ibrahim al-Kanemi.

References

13th-century writers from al-Andalus
13th-century Moroccan poets
13th-century Moroccan people
12th-century Moroccan people
People from Fez, Morocco
1230 deaths
Year of birth unknown